3C-BZ (4-benzyloxy-3,5-dimethoxyamphetamine) is a lesser-known psychedelic drug and a substituted amphetamine. 3C-BZ was first synthesized by Alexander Shulgin. In his book PiHKAL, the dosage range is listed as 25–200 mg and the duration as 18–24 hours. According to anecdotal reports from the substance's entry in PiHKAL, 3C-BZ's effects can vary significantly, ranging from intensified emotions and strange dreams, to effects similar to those of LSD or TMA. Very little data exists about the pharmacological properties, metabolism, and toxicity of 3C-BZ.

Synthesis 
3C-BZ was originally synthesized by Alexander Shulgin starting from 5-methoxyeugenol (4-allyl-2,6-dimethoxyphenol) through a reaction with benzyl chloride to form the benzyloxy derivative of 5-methoxyeugenol.  The obtained benzyl derivative was reacted with tetranitromethane to form 1-[4-(Benzyloxy)-3,5-dimethoxyphenyl]-2-nitro-1-propene, from which 3C-BZ is obtained by reduction of the nitropropene with lithium aluminum hydride.  Another possible synthetic route would be the reaction of benzyl chloride with syringaldehyde to form 3,5-dimethoxy-4-benzyloxybenzaldehyde followed by condensation with nitroethane to form 1-[4-(Benzyloxy)-3,5-dimethoxyphenyl]-2-nitro-1-propene.  The obtained nitropropene can be reduced using lithium aluminum hydride, Red-Al, or an aluminum-mercury amalgam.

References

O-methylated phenols
Psychedelic phenethylamines
Substituted amphetamines